In human interactions, good faith is a sincere intention to be fair, open, and honest, regardless of the outcome of the interaction. Some Latin phrases have lost their literal meaning over centuries, but that is not the case with bona fides, which is still widely used and interchangeable with its generally-accepted modern-day English translation of good faith. It is an important concept within law and business. The opposed concepts are bad faith, mala fides (duplicity) and perfidy (pretense). In contemporary English, the usage of bona fides is synonymous with credentials and identity. The phrase is sometimes used in job advertisements, and should not be confused with the bona fide occupational qualifications or the employer's good faith effort, as described below.

Bona fides

 is a Latin phrase meaning "good faith". While today  is concomitant to faith, a more technical translation of the Latin concept would be something like "reliability", in the sense of a trust between two parties for the potentiality of a relationship. In ancient Rome bona fides was always assumed by both sides, and it had implied responsibilities and both legal and religious consequences if broken. Fides was one of the original virtues to be considered a religious "divinity" in Roman paganism. Modern interpretation is that it is a return of favor for the completion of a favor.

Law

In law, bona fides denotes the mental and moral states of honesty and conviction regarding either the truth or the falsity of a proposition, or of a body of opinion; likewise regarding either the rectitude or the depravity of a line of conduct. As a legal concept, bona fides is especially important in matters of equity. The concept of bona fide is also proclaimed by the original version of Magna Carta. In contract law, the implied covenant of good faith is a general presumption that the parties to a contract will deal with each other honestly and fairly, so as not to destroy the right of the other party or parties to receive the benefits of the contract. In insurance law, the insurer's breach of the implied covenant may give rise to a legal liability known as insurance bad faith.

Most US jurisdictions view breaches of implied covenants of good faith and fair dealing solely as a variant of breach of contract. Linguistically, in the US, American English usage of bona fides applies it as synonymous with credentials, professional background, and documents attesting a person's identity, which is not synonymous with bona fide occupational qualifications. More recently, other common law countries have begun to adopt good faith as a general principle. In the UK, the High Court in Yam Seng Pte Ltd v International Trade Corp Ltd expressed this preference. In Canada, the Supreme Court declared in Bhasin v Hrynew that good faith was a general organizing principle.

Employment efforts
Bona fide occupational qualifications (employer's good faith effort) are qualities or attributes that employers are allowed to consider when making decisions on the hiring and retaining of employees. An employer's good faith effort is used as an evaluation tool by the jurisdiction during the annual program review process to determine an employer's level of commitment to the reduction goals of the Washington State's Commute Trip Reduction Law. United States federal and state governments are required by affirmative action (and other such laws) to look for disabled, minority, female, and veteran business enterprises when bidding public jobs. Good faith effort law varies from state to state and even within states depending on the awarding department of the government. Most good faith effort requires advertising in state certified publications, usually a trade and a focus publication. Other countries such as Canada have similar programs.

In wikis
Public wikis depend on implicitly or explicitly assuming that its users are acting in good faith. Wikipedia's principle Assume Good Faith (often abbreviated AGF) has been a stated guideline since 2005. It has been described as "the first principle in the Wikipedia etiquette". According to one study of users' motives for contributing to Wikipedia, "while participants have both individualistic and collaborative motives, collaborative (altruistic) motives dominate."

See also
 Bad faith
 Convention Relating to the Status of Refugees
 Hanlon's razor
 Honour system
 Kindness
 List of Latin phrases
 Make one's bones
 Pacta sunt servanda
 Uberrima fides (utmost good faith)

References

External links

 "Good Faith Effort with California Department of Transportation"

Legal doctrines and principles
Contract law
Equitable defenses
Intention
Latin philosophical phrases